Einar Nerman (6 October 1888 – 30 March 1983) was a Swedish artist known for his portraits, book and magazine illustrations and theatrical designs.

Early life and education 

He grew up in a middle-class family in Norrköping with his twin brother, archeologist Birger Nerman, and older brother, Swedish Communist leader Ture Nerman. Their parents were Janne Emanuel Nerman and Ida Anna Adéle Nordberg.

In 1905 Nerman dropped out of Norrköping Gymnasium High School and enrolled into the Konstnärsförbundets skola in Stockholm. In 1908 he went to Paris to study with Henri Matisse at the Academie Matisse and at the Académie Colarossi. In 1910 he published Artists which contained cartoons and caricatures. In 1912 he returned to Sweden to study music and dance at the drama school of Elin Svensson.

The young artist exhibited with the male-only Avant-garde group "" (1907–1911), an association that defied the Royal Swedish Academy of Fine Arts.  During the 1911 exhibition Nerman's drawings were shown alongside sculptures by Ivar Johnsson, graphics by Artur Sahlén, and miniatures by Fanny Falkner.

He provided illustrations for "The Swineherd" (1912) by Hans Christian Andersen and "Gösta Berlings: pictures" (1916). He also illustrated the children's picture books Crow's Dream (1911), Stars (1913), and illustrations for the novel Short Cavalier stories (1918) by Selma Lagerlöf.

In 1918 he met Ivor Novello in a night-club in Stockholm who suggested Nerman should draw the stars of the West End of London.

In 1919 he visited London as a ballet dancer, performing in a variety at the London Coliseum.  When he discovered that they were to tour the provincial music halls as well, he broke his contract and returned to Sweden.

Career 

In 1921 Nerman moved to London to work on a weekly page of theatrical caricatures for The Tatler. He also submitted caricatures of musicians performing at the Royal Albert Hall and elsewhere to the fashionable magazine Eve: The Lady's Pictorial. When his friend Ivor Novello opened the "Fifty-fifty" club for theater people, Nerman was asked to decorate the walls.

In 1923 he published the children's book Knight Finn Komfusenfej.

In 1925 he collaborated with Christine Doorman on Selma Lagerlöf: her life and works in Mårbacka.

He made the illustrations for the 1928 edition of Thumbelina, by Hans Christian Andersen.

In 1929 he published Darlings of the gods: in music hall, revue, and musical comedy to compile his caricatures of theater stars featured in The Tatler since 1922. The same year his caricatures were in The second minuet by English composer Maurice Besly, with foreword by British novelist Alec Waugh.

In 1930, Nerman returned to Sweden and bought Hersbyholm, an 18th-century house in Lidingö. By then, he and his wife Kajsa Susanne had three children.

During World War II the family relocated to New York City where Nerman was hired by the New York Journal-American to draw Hollywood stars like Joan Crawford and Alfred Hitchcock, among them Swedish friends Greta Garbo and Ingrid Bergman. In 1939 he published A trip to gingerbread land.

In 1944 Nerman published Portraits by Nerman. In 1946 he published Caricature and illustrated Fairy Tales from the North, a collection of fairy tales from Denmark, Sweden and Norway by Peter Christen Asbjørnsen.

In 1950 Nerman returned to Lidingö where he became a member of the Association of Swedish Professional Illustrators and Graphic Designers. In 1964 he illustrated "The Goose Girl" by the Brothers Grimm. In 1969 he published The wedding in Valpköping and other animal tales. He died in 1983.

Legacy 

Nerman acknowledged he was influenced during his youth by oriental artists, Norwegian artist Olaf Gulbransson, and Henri Matisse; later on also by Aubrey Beardsley and Ralph Barton.

He made the illustrations for many of the books of Swedish Nobel Prize in Literature Selma Lagerlöf and earned a name in his country for designing all images behind the Solstickan matchbox. He also made many of the artistic book covers for his brother Birger's published writings and wrote songs and composed music to many of his brother Ture’s poems.

In 2020 his portraits of Einar Jolin (1908), Isaac Grünewald (1907), Hanna Maria Sahlström in an interior (1911) were sold at auction.

Gallery

Notes

Sources 
 Einar Nerman:  "Caricature", Holme Press Incorporated, 1946.
 Sandy Wilson:  "Caught in the act", George G. Harrap & Co. Ltd, Great Britain 1976.
 Maria Nikolajeva, Carole Scott:  "How picturebooks work", Psychology Press, 2001, p. 60.
 Elina Druker, Bettina Kümmerling-Meibauer:  "Childrens books in the avant-garde", John Benjamins Publishing Company, 2015, pp. 45, 49, 62 & 63.

External links 
Cover Drawing of Greta Garbo by Einar Nerman ("Greta Garbos Saga", The first written biography about Greta Garbo – Stockholm 1929)
 Einar Nerman | Images Musicales Stories
 Einar Nerman ( 1888–1983)
 Einar Nerman's Beautifully Illustrated Sheet-Music Covers - Illustration Chronicles
 Einar Nerman
 Einar Nerman: from the picturebook page to the avant-garde stage
 Solstickan match box
 Einar Nerman at the Nationalmuseum of Sweden:  Nationalmuseum - Einar Nerman

1888 births
1983 deaths
People from Norrköping
Swedish illustrators